Daniel Goldberg is a Canadian film producer and screenwriter.  He was a writer in the film Feds and producer of the 2003 film Old School.

Goldberg is also a producer of The Hangover film series.

Filmography

Films

Television

References

External links
 

Living people
Canadian film producers
Canadian male screenwriters
Year of birth missing (living people)
Golden Globe Award-winning producers
20th-century Canadian screenwriters
20th-century Canadian male writers
21st-century Canadian screenwriters
21st-century Canadian male writers